Mount Sir Wilfrid Laurier is the highest peak of the Cariboo Mountains in the east-central interior of British Columbia, Canada.  The mountain is part of the Premier Range, which is located just west of Valemount.

The name honours the seventh Prime Minister of Canada, Sir Wilfrid Laurier, who died in 1919. Originally named "Mount Titan" by American mountaineer Allen Carpé, it was officially renamed in 1929 to honour Canada's Liberal prime minister.



See also
 Geography of British Columbia
 List of mountain peaks of North America

References

External links

Three-thousanders of British Columbia
Cariboo Mountains
Regional District of Fraser-Fort George
Cariboo Land District